A lattice bridge is a form of truss bridge that uses many small, closely spaced diagonal elements forming a lattice. The lattice Truss Bridge was patented in 1820 by architect Ithiel Town.

Originally a design to allow a substantial bridge to be made from planks employing lower–skilled labor, rather than heavy timbers and more expensive carpenters, this type of bridge has also been constructed using many relatively light iron or steel members. The individual elements are more easily handled by the construction workers, but the bridge also requires substantial support during construction. A simple lattice truss will transform the applied loads into a thrust, as the bridge will tend to change length under load. This is resisted by pinning the lattice members to the top and bottom chords, which are more substantial than the lattice members, but which may also be fabricated from relatively small elements rather than large beams.

Belfast truss

The Belfast truss is a cross between Town's lattice truss and the bowstring truss. It was developed in Ireland as a wide-span shallow rise roof truss for industrial structures. McTear & Co of Belfast, Ireland began fabricating these trusses in wood starting around 1866. By 1899, spans of  had been achieved, and in the 20th century, shipyards and airplane hangars demanded ever greater clear spans.

Wood lattice truss bridges

Bartonsville Covered Bridge
Brown Covered Bridge
Burt Henry Covered Bridge
Cornish-Windsor Covered Bridge
Euharlee Covered Bridge
Kingsley Covered Bridge
Newton Falls Covered Bridge, Newton Falls, Ohio
Poole's Mill Covered Bridge
Root Road Covered Bridge
Waterford Covered Bridge
Watson Mill Covered Bridge
Windsor Mills Covered Bridge
Worrall Covered Bridge
Frankenfield Covered Bridge
Uhlerstown Covered Bridge, Pennsylvania
Van Tran Flat Bridge
Zehnder's Holz Brucke

Iron or steel lattice truss bridges

Howard Carroll built the first completely wrought-iron lattice truss bridge.  This was built for the New York Central Railroad in 1859.
Bennerley Viaduct
Bridge in Brown Township
Dowery Dell Viaduct, also known as Hunnington or Frankley Viaduct
Kew Railway Bridge
Norwottuck Rail Trail Bridge
Willow Creek Bridge (1913), in Pierce County, Nebraska
Upper Slate Run Bridge (1890), a 'quintangular' lattice truss in Lycoming County, Pennsylvania

See also

Lattice girder
Brown truss

References

External links
Picture and description of Town's lattice truss
Watson Mill Bridge, Georgia, US

Truss bridges by type